Henry Morrison Logan (May 1888 – after 1910) was a Scottish professional footballer who played as an inside forward for Sunderland.

References

1888 births
Footballers from Glasgow
Scottish footballers
Association football inside forwards
Benburb F.C. players
Glasgow United F.C. players
Sunderland A.F.C. players
Arsenal F.C. players
English Football League players
Year of death missing